Daiji Yamada (山田 大治、born June 8, 1981) is a Japanese professional basketball player. He plays for Toyama Grouses of the Japanese B.League. 
Yamada also is a long-time member of the Japan national basketball team, playing for the team in the 2006 FIBA World Championship and both the FIBA Asia Championship 2007 and FIBA Asia Championship 2009.  He made his debut for the national team in 1999 at the FIBA World Championship for Junior Men

Yamada averaged 7 points and 2.3 rebounds per game for the host Japanese at the 2006 FIBA World Championship.  In his most recent national team appearance, Yamada averaged 10 points and 4.6 rebounds per game for the Japanese at the FIBA Asia Championship 2009 tournament.  Despite his performance, Japan stumbled to a disappointing tenth place finish, its worst ever performance in 24 FIBA Asia Championship appearances.

Yamada played professionally with Hokkaido in the JBL Super League.  In the  2009-10 season, Yamada entered the month-long winter break averaging 14 points and 4.9 rebounds per game for the Alvark.

References

1981 births
Living people
Alvark Tokyo players
Basketball players at the 2010 Asian Games
Hiroshima Dragonflies players
Levanga Hokkaido players
Nihon University Red Sharks men's basketball players
Utsunomiya Brex players
Japanese men's basketball players
Panasonic Trians players
Power forwards (basketball)
Toyama Grouses players
2006 FIBA World Championship players
Asian Games competitors for Japan